Nationality words link to articles with information on the nation's poetry or literature (for instance, Irish or France).

Events
 January 1 – Two poems written in 1965 by Mao Zedong just before the Cultural Revolution, including "Two Birds: A Dialogue", are published
 April 5 – 1976 Tiananmen Incident in Beijing, China: the display of poems against the Gang of Four are among events provoking a police crackdown.
 Lille Stesichorus, the largest fragments of work attributed to Ancient Greek poet Stesichorus, are first published

Works published in English
Listed by nation where the work was first published and again by the poet's native land, if different; substantially revised works listed separately:

Australia
 R. Berndt (ed.), Love Songs of Arnhem Land (anthology)
 Anne Elder, posthumous, Crazy Woman
 John Forbes, Tropical Skiing (Poets of the Month Series), Sydney: Angus & Robertson.
 Les Murray, The Vernacular Republic Selected Poems
 John Tranter, The Alphabet Murders (notes from a work in progress), Angus & Robertson
 Chris Wallace-Crabbe, The Foundations of Joy (Poets of the Month Series), Sydney: Angus & Robertson.

Canada
 Earle Birney:
 Alphabeings and Other Seasyours. London, Ont.: Pikadilly Press.
 The Rugging and the Moving Times: poems new and uncollected 1976. Coatsworth, ON: Black Moss Press.
 Gary Geddes, War & Other Measures
 Roland Giguere, Miron translated from French
 Archibald Lampman, Lampman's Sonnets: The Complete Sonnets of Archibald Lampman, Margaret Coulby Whitridge ed. (Ottawa: Borealis). 
 Irving Layton, For My Brother Jesus. Toronto: McClelland and Stewart.
 Irving Layton, The Uncollected Poems of Irving Layton: 1936-59. Ed. W. David John. Ottawa, ON: Mosaic Press.
Dennis Lee. The Death of Harold Ladoo. Vancouver: Kanchenjunga Press.
 Al Purdy, Sundance at Dusk
 James Reaney, Selected Longer Poems.
 Joe Rosenblatt, Top Soil, Selected Poems (1962-1975). Press Porcepic.
 Charles Sangster, Norland echoes and other strains and lyrics, ed. Frank M. Tierney (Tecumseh)
 Raymond Souster,  To Hell with Poetry. Burton, Ohio.
Anthologies
 New Provinces reprinted—first anthology of modernist poetry in Canada (originally published 1936), including work by F. R. Scott, E. J. Pratt, Robert Finch, A. J. M. Smith, Leo Kennedy, A. M. Klein.

India in English
 Arun Kolatkar, Jejuri, Bombay: Clearing House, India.
 Nissim Ezekiel:
 Hymns in Darkness, Delhi, Oxford University Press
 Poster Prayers,
 Gieve Patel, How Do You Withstand, Body, Bombay, Clearing House, Indian, Indian poetry in English-language
 Keki Daruwalla, Crossing of Rivers, an experimental work published by the author's own publishing house; Bombay: Ezra-Fakir Press
 Adil Jussawalla, Missing Person,
 Jayanta Mahapatra:
 A Father's Hours, Calcutta: United Writers
 A Rain of Rites, Athens, Georgia: University of Georgia Press
 Arvind Krishna Mehrotra, Nine Enclosures,
 Meena Alexander, The Bird's Bright Ring, Calcutta: Writers Workshop, India.
 Arundhathi Subramaniam, Nine Enclosures (poetry in English), Mumbai: Clearing House
 Gauri Deshpande, An Anthology of Indo English Poetry, Delhi: Hind Pocket Books
 Nolini Kanta Gupta, Collected Works, five vols, published from 1971 to this year; Pondicherry: Sri Aurobindo Book Distribution Agency
 Rohini K. Gupta, Karna and Other Poems, Calcutta: Writers Workshop
 Om Prakash Bhatnagar, Thought Poems, Aligarh: Skylark Pub.
 Deb Kumar Das, Winterbird Walks, Calcutta: Writers Workshop
 Jagannath Prasad Das, First Person, Delhi: Arnold Heinemann
 Mukand R. Dave, Some Sheets of Paper, Aligarh: Skylark Pub.
 R. Parthasarathy (ed.), Ten Twentieth Century Indian Poets, Delhi: Oxford University Press

Ireland
 Ciarán Carson:  The New Estate, Blackstaff Press, Wake Forest University Press
 John Ennis (poet), Night on Hibernia Oldcastle: The New Gallery Press, 
 Michael Longley, Man Lying on a Wall - Northern Ireland poet published in the United Kingdom
 George McWhirter, Queen of the Sea, Northern Ireland poet published in Canada

New Zealand
 James K. Baxter, posthumous
 The Bone Chanter: Unpublished Poems 1945–72, edited by J. E. Weir
 The Holy Life and Death of Concrete Grady: Various Uncollected and Unpublished Poems, edited by J. E. Weir
 Alan Brunton, Black & White Anthology, a 33-part sequence with an Asian setting, Hawk Press
 Vincent O'Sullivan, James K. Baxter, biography, New Zealand

United Kingdom
 Kenneth Allott, Collected Poems
 W. H. Auden, Collected Poems of W. H. Auden, edited by Edward Mendelson
 Pam Ayres, Some of Me Poetry and Some More of Me Poetry
 Frances Bellerby, The First Known (posthumous)
 Zoë Brooks, Owl Shadows and Whispering Stone "parallel booklets"
 George Mackay Brown, Winterfold
 Ciarán Carson:  The New Estate, Blackstaff Press, Wake Forest University Press
 Elizabeth Daryush, Collected Poems
 David Day, Brass Rubbings
 Patric Dickinson, The Bearing Beast
 Gavin Ewart, No Fool Like an Old Fool
 Ruth Fainlight, Another Full Moon
 Tony Flynn, Separations
 Alistair Fowler, Catagomb Suburb
 Thom Gunn, Jack Straw's Castle, and Other Poems
 Adrian Henri, One Year, Todmorden, Lancashire: Arc Publications, 
 Ted Hughes, Season Songs
 Clive James, Peregrine Prykke's Pilgrimage Through the London Literary World and Britannia Bright's Bewilderment in the Wilderness of Westminster, Australian poet resident in the United Kingdom
 Glyn Jones, Selected Poems
 Peter Levi, Collected Poems
 Michael Longley, Man Lying on a Wall Northern Ireland poet published in the United Kingdom
 Hugh MacDiarmid, Collected Poems
 Hugh Maxton, The Noise of the Fields
 Humphrey John Moore, Collected Poems
Eleanor Murray, Black and Sepia
 Luke Parsons, Last Poems
 Brian Patten, Vanishing Trick
 Rodney Pybus, Bridging Loans
 Peter Reading, The Prison Cell and Barrel Mystery
 Jon Silkin, The Little Time-Keeper
 Derek Walcott, Sea Grapes
 David Wright, A View of the North
 Edmund Leo Wright, The Horwich Hennets (the poet invented the "hennet", a 12-line hendecasyllabic verse with the rhymes "abacbcde deff")
 Paul Yates, Sky Made of Stone

Anthologies in the United Kingdom
 Elaine Feinstein, editor and translator, Three Russian Poets: Margarite Aliger, Yunna Morits, Bella Akhmadulina, Manchester, Carcanet Press
 F. E. S. Finn, Here and Human
 Antonia Fraser, Scottish Love Poems
 Dannie Abse, Poetry Dimension Annual 4
 Howard Sergeant, New Poems 1976/1977, P.E.N. anthology

United States
 Diane Ackerman, The Planets
 Paul Auster, translator, The Uninhabited, poetry translated from the original French of André du Bouchet
 Ted Berrigan, Red Wagon
 Elizabeth Bishop, One Act
 Peter Blue Cloud, Turtle, Bear, and Wolf
 Raymond Carver, At Night The Salmon Move
 Maxine Chernoff, Vegetable Emergency, prose poems (Beyond Baroque Foundation)
 Robert Creeley, Selected Poems
 James Dickey, The Zodiac
 Ed Dorn, translator, Selected Poems of Cesar Vallejo, Penguin
 Charles Doyle, James K. Baxter, Boston: Twayne (Twayne's World Authors Series); study of the New Zealand poet
 Irving Feldman, Leaping Clear
 Marya Fiamengo, In Praise of Older Women
 Stratis Haviaras, Crossing the River Twice (Greek poet writing in English)
 John Hollander, Reflections on Espionage
 Robert Lowell, Selected Poems
 James Merrill: Divine Comedies, including "Lost in Translation" and "The Book of Ephraim", a long narrative poem
 N. Scott Momaday, The Gourd Dancer
 Lorine Niedecker, Blue Chicory (published posthumously)
 Simon Ortiz, Going for the Rain
 Kenneth Rexroth, 100 More Poems from the Japanese
 Charles Reznikoff, Poems 1918-1936
 Muriel Rukeyser, The Gates
 Anne Sexton, 45 Mercy Street (posthumous)
 James Tate, Viper Jazz

Criticism, scholarship and biography in the United States
 Harold Bloom, Poetry and Repression, the final volume of a tetralogy that began with The Anxiety of Influence in 1973
 Cleanth Brooks and Robert Penn Warren, Understanding Poetry (college textbook), originally published in 1938, goes into its fourth edition (after revised editions in 1950 and 1960); this would be the final edition before the deaths of the authors

Other in English
 Shana Yardan, The Listening of Eyes (Guyana)

Works published in other languages
Listed by language and often by nation where the work was first published and again by the poet's native land, if different; substantially revised works listed separately:

Denmark
 Jørgen Gustava Brandt:
 Jothárram
 Mit hjerte i København
 Regnansigt
 Klaus Høeck, Pentagram, publisher: Gyldendal
 Jørgen Nash, Her er jeg
 Henrik Nordbrandt, Glas ("Glass") Copenhagen: Gylendal, 53 pp.
 Klaus Rifbjerg, Stranden
 Jørgen Sonne, Huset ("The House")

Finland
 Paavo Haavikko, Viiniä, kirjoitusta
 Hannu Mäkelä, Synkkyys pohjaton, ninn myös iloni, onneni
 Jarkko Laine, Viidenpennin Hamlet
 Matti Rossi, Laulu tummana tulevi
 Matti Kuusi, Kansanruno Kalevala, a reconstruction of the folk poems that formed the basis of the Finnish national epic, Kaalevala, compiled in 1849 by Elias Lönnrot.

French language

France
 Anne-Marie Albiach, Objet
 Roland Bacri, Roland Bacri (the name of the author and book are the same)
 Hervé Bazin, Traits
 Jean Berthet, L'éternel instant
 Philippe Chabaneix, Dix nouvelles romances
 René Char, Aromates chasseurs ("Hunter's Aromatic Herbs")
 Jean Daive, Le jeu des séries scéniques
 Christian Dedeyan, Chant du Houlme
 Roger Giroux, Théatre, published posthumously (died 1973)
 Robert Houdelot, Les Treize
 Edmond Jabès, Le Livre des Ressemblances
 Jacques Marlet, Toi qui pâlis au nom de Vancouver
 Robert Marteau, Atlante
 Jacques Prévert, Grand Bal du printemps
 Raymond Queneau, Morale élémentaire
 J. P. Seguin, LAnnée poétique 1975

Criticism, scholarship and biography
 John Edwin Jackson, a study of Yves Bonnefoy

Canada
 Georges Cartier, Chanteaux
 Paul Chanel Malenfant, Poèmes de la mères pays
 Marie Uguay, Signe et rumeur
 A Quebec collective of women, La Nef des sorcières

German language

West Germany
 Horst Bienek, Gleiwitzer Kindheit
 H. M. Enzensberger, Mausoleum: 37 Ballads From the History of Progress
 Michael Kruger, Reginapoly
 Ernst Meister, Im Zeitspalt
 Aleksandr Solzhenitsyn, Prussian Nights, translated into German from the original Russian by Nikolaus Ehlert; first written in 1951; first published in 1974
 Jurgen Theobaldy and Gustav Zürcher, Veränderung der Lyrik: Über westdeutsche Gedichte seit 1965

East Germany
 Erich Arendt, Memento und Bild

India
Listed in alphabetical order by first name:
 Amritdhari Singha, Avatar rahasya, India, Maithili-language
 Heeraben Pathak, Paraloke Patra, a poem addressing her deceased husband, poet Ramnarayan Pathak; Indian poet writing in Gujarati-language
 Joy Goswami Christmas o Sheeter Sonnetguchcho ("Sonnets of Christmas and Winter"), the author's first book of poetry; Bangladeshi-language
 K. Siva Reddy, Aasupatrigeetam, Hyderabad: Jhari Poetry Circle, Telugu-language
 Namdeo Dhasal, Priyadarshini; Marathi-language
 Nirendranath Chakravarti, Kobitar Bodoley Kobita, Kolkata: Bishhobani Prokashoni; Bengali-language
 Rajendra Kishore Panda, Anavatar O Anya Anya, Cuttack: Grantha Mandir, Oraya-language

Italy
 Dario Bellezza, Morta segreta
 Alberto Bevilacqua, La crudeltà
 Amelia Rosselli, Documento 1966-73
 Angelo M. Ripellino, La splendido violino verde
 Maria Luisa Spaziani, Ultrasuoni

Norway
 Göran Sonnevi, Det omöjliga
 Sten Hagliden, Kvällsordat
 Barbro Lindgren, Rapporter från marken

Poland
 M. Jastrum (ed.), Poezja Mtodej Polski, anthology
 A. Lam (ed.), Kolumbowie i wspótcześni, second edition, anthology
 Z. Liberia (ed.), Poezja polska XVIII wieku ("Polish Poetry of the Eighteenth Century"), second edition, anthology
 Wisława Szymborska: Wielka liczba ("A Large Number")

Portuguese language

Portugal
 Ruy de Moura Belo, Toda a terra ("All of the Land")
 Carlos de Oliveira, Trabalho Poético
 Egito Gonçalves, Luz Vegital
 Eugénio de Andrade, Limar dos Pássaros
 António Ramos Rosa, Ciclo do Cavalo
 Pedro Tamen, Agora, Estar

Brazil
 Marcus Accioly, Sisifo, a long poem containing multiple forms of poetry, including the classical sonnet, concrete and popular Brazilian forms
 Yolanda Jordão, Biografia do Edificio e Anexos
 Adélia Prado, Bagagem

Spanish language

Spain
 Matilde Camus, Siempre amor ("Forever Love")
 Antonio Colinas, Sepulcro en Taruinia
 Justo Jorge Padrón, Los círculos del infierno
 Claudio Rodriguez, El vuelo de la celebración

Latin America
 Guadalupe Amor, El zoológico de Pita Amor
 Jomi García Ascot, Un modo de decir
 Arturo Corcuera, Las sirenas y las estaciones (Peru)
 José Emilio Pacheco, Islas à la deriva (Mexico)
 A workshop in "synthetic poetry" came out with Doce modos

Other languages
 Gerrit Kouwenaar, Verzamelde Gedichten (Netherlands)
 Alexander Mezhirov, Под старым небом ("Under the Old Sky"), Russia, Soviet Union

Awards and honors

Canada
 See 1976 Governor General's Awards for a complete list of winners and finalists for those awards.

United Kingdom
 Cholmondeley Award: Peter Porter, Fleur Adcock
 Eric Gregory Award: Stewart Brown, Valerie Gillies, Paul Groves, Paul Hyland, Nigel Jenkins, Andrew Motion, Tom Paulin, William Peskett

United States
 Consultant in Poetry to the Library of Congress (later the post would be called "Poet Laureate Consultant in Poetry to the Library of Congress"): Robert Hayden appointed this year.
 Frost Medal: A.M. Sullivan
 National Book Award for Poetry: John Ashbery, Self-portrait in a Convex Mirror
 Pulitzer Prize for Poetry: John Ashbery: Self-Portrait in a Convex Mirror
 Walt Whitman Award: Laura Gilpin, The Hocus-Pocus of the Universe
 Fellowship of the Academy of American Poets: J. V. Cunningham
 Lenore Marshall Poetry Prize: Denise Levertov, The Freeing of the Dust (Judge: Hayden Carruth)

Births
 September 2 – Tim Key, English comic performer and performance poet
 Jen Hadfield, British poet and visual artist
 Meghan O'Rourke, American writer, editor and poet; writer for Slate; a poetry editor for The Paris Review
 Yolanda Wisher, African American poet and spoken word artist

Deaths

Birth years link to the corresponding "[year] in poetry" article:
 January 22 – Charles Reznikoff, 81 (born 1894), American Objectivist poet
 March 7 – Tove Ditlevsen, 58 (born 1917), Danish poet and fiction writer, suicide by overdose
 March 10 – L. E. Sissman, 48 (born 1928), American poet, advertising executive and Quiz Kid, of Hodgkin's disease
 March 12 – Lloyd Frankenberg, 67 (born 1907), American poet, anthologist and critic, husband of painter Loren Maclver
 April 9 – Saneatsu Mushanokōji 武者小路 実篤 實篤, sometimes known as "Mushakōji Saneatsu"; other pen-names included "Musha" and "Futo-o", 90 (born 1885), Japanese, late Taishō period and Shōwa period novelist, playwright, poet, artist and philosopher
 April 28 – Richard Hughes, 76 (born 1900), English poet, fiction writer and screenwriter
 May 11 – Ogiwara Seisensui 荻原井泉水, pen name of Ogiwara Tōkichi, 91 (born 1884), Japanese haiku poet in the Taishō and Shōwa periods
 July 11 – León de Greiff, 88 (born 1895), Colombian poet
 August 19 – Jan Nisar Akhtar, 62 (born 1914), Indian poet of Urdu ghazals and nazms, a lyricist for Bollywood and father of psychiatrist and poet Salman Akhtar
 August 29 – Kazi Nazrul Islam (also spelled "Kazi Nozrul Islam"), 77 (born 1899), Bengali poet, musician, revolutionary and philosopher best known as the Bidrohi Kobi ("Rebel Poet"), popular among Bengalis and considered the national poet of Bangladesh
 September 30 – Paul Dehn, 63 (born 1912), English screenwriter and poet
 October 15 – James McAuley, 59 (born 1917), Australian poet, academic, journalist and literary critic
 October 18 – Viswanatha Satyanarayana, 81 (born 1895), Indian poet writing in Telugu; popularly known as the Kavi Samraat ("Emperor of Poetry")
 October 23 – Anne Elder, 58 (born 1918), Australian ballet dancer and poet, of cardiopulmonary disease
 December 8 – Henryk Jasiczek, 57 (born 1919), Polish journalist, poet, writer and dissident
 Full date unknown – Henriette Sauret (born 1890), French poet, political writer, journalist

See also

 Poetry
 List of poetry awards
 List of years in poetry

Notes

 Britannica Book of the Year 1977 ("for events of 1976"), published by Encyclopædia Britannica 1977 (source of many items in "Works published" section and rarely in other sections)

20th-century poetry
Poetry